The Globe Hotel is located in Baileys Harbor, Wisconsin.

History
The site served as a hotel from 1874 to 1886. It was operated by Roger Eatough, a local politician. The building was listed on the National Register of Historic Places in 1982 and on the State Register of Historic Places in 1989.

References

Hotel buildings on the National Register of Historic Places in Wisconsin
National Register of Historic Places in Door County, Wisconsin
Defunct hotels in the United States
Greek Revival architecture in Wisconsin